Zaire was the name between 1971 and 1997 of what is now the Democratic Republic of the Congo

Zaire may also refer to:

Geography
 Congo River, once often called "Zaire River" 
 Zaire Province of Angola

Others
 Zaire (name), includes a list of people with the given name or surname
 Zaire Use, a variation of the common mass of the Roman Catholic Church
 Zairean zaire, 1967–97 currency of Congo/Zaire 
 Zaïre (play), a 1732 play by Voltaire
 Zaïre. Revue Congolaise—Congoleesch Tijdschrift, Belgian African studies journal
 "In Zaire", a 1976 song by Johnny Wakelin